Travis Bond (born December 10, 1990) is a former Gridiron football offensive lineman. He was drafted by the Minnesota Vikings in the 2013 NFL Draft. He played college football at North Carolina. He has also played for the Carolina Panthers, St. Louis Rams, Los Angeles KISS, and Edmonton Eskimos. Bond is notable for his size, having been nicknamed "Treetop" as a child.

Professional career

Minnesota Vikings
Prior to being drafted, Bond was victim of a hit and run when he was run over by a truck driving between 10 and 20 mph. The truck was dented in two spots, but Bond walked away without any obvious injuries; it was several weeks later when Bond was lifting weights that he felt discomfort in his wrist from the incident. 
On April 27, 2013, he was drafted by the Minnesota Vikings in the seventh round, 214 overall pick of the 2013 NFL Draft.
Bond was released by the Vikings on August 31, 2013 (along with 18 others) to get to a 53-man roster and signed to the practice squad the next day.

Carolina Panthers
The Carolina Panthers signed Bond off the Vikings practice squad on November 13, 2013. He played in two games for the Panthers in 2013. He was waived from Carolina on May 19, 2014.

St. Louis Rams
The St. Louis Rams acquired Bond off waivers on May 20, 2014. He was waived during final cuts on August 29, 2014.

Los Angeles KISS
On November 16, 2015, Bond was assigned to the Los Angeles KISS of the Arena Football League (during the off-season).

Winnipeg Blue Bombers
On March 8, 2016, Bond signed a contract with the Winnipeg Blue Bombers of the Canadian Football League. He played in 12 games for the team in 2016, and for his stellar play, was named to the league All-Star team. Bond played in 16 games with the Blue Bombers in 2017, and became a free agent the following year.

Edmonton Eskimos
Bond initially signed with Winnipeg's hated rivals, the Saskatchewan Roughriders for 2018. Despite receiving a notable signing bonus, Bond was released after the preseason, and signed with the Edmonton Eskimos, where he played 17 games. Bond signed an extension with Edmonton for 2019, where he played in 13 games and recorded his first career special teams tackle.

References

External links
North Carolina Tar Heels bio 
Minnesota Vikings bio

1990 births
Living people
American football offensive guards
American players of Canadian football
Canadian football offensive linemen
Carolina Panthers players
Los Angeles Kiss players
Minnesota Vikings players
North Carolina Tar Heels football players
People from Bertie County, North Carolina
Players of American football from North Carolina
St. Louis Rams players
Winnipeg Blue Bombers players
Edmonton Elks players